Ensemble Theatre can refer to:

The Ensemble Theatre, an American theatre company in Houston, Texas, U.S.
The Ensemble Theatre, an Australian theatre company in Sydney, Australia